A Batalha do Passinho (Portuguese: "Passinho Battle", lit. "The Battle of Passinho"; English release title Passinho Dance-Off) is a 2012 Brazilian documentary film directed by Emílio Domingos. The film follows a dance known as "passinho", which emerged from the funk carioca scene in the early 2000s.

Synopsis 
The style of dancing which developed in the favelas of Rio de Janeiro and is known as passinho evolved out of the funk carioca culture. After a video of a group of friends at a barbecue, Passinho Foda, received four million hits on YouTube, dancers from other communities began to upload their own home-made clips, and the dance quickly spread across Rio de Janeiro. The documentary shows the dancers and the phenomenon expanding beyond the bailes, slums and DJs.

See also
Battle of the year

References

2012 films
2010s Portuguese-language films
Brazilian documentary films
Documentary films about dance
Films shot in Rio de Janeiro (city)